The 2017 UCLA Bruins baseball team represented the University of California, Los Angeles in the 2017 NCAA Division I baseball season as a member of the Pac-12 Conference. The team was coached by John Savage and played their home games at Jackie Robinson Stadium.

Previous season

The Bruins finished 25–31 overall, and 12–18 in the conference. The Bruins were not invited to the NCAA Division I tournament.

MLB Draft Selections

The Bruins had six individuals selected in the 2016 MLB draft.

Roster

Schedule

References

UCLA
UCLA Bruins baseball seasons
UCLA
UCLA